Hawo Tako (died 1948) was a prominent Somali activist.

Biography
Hawo Tako belonged to the Abaskuul, Jidwaaq Absame clan which settles the Middle Juba region of Somalia as well as the Fafan valleys in the Somali Region of Ethiopia. A member of SYL, Tako participated in the 1948 riots in Mogadishu that followed the visit of the Four-Power Commission, where she was killed. The Mogadishu massacre of 1948 many were killed 14, including Hawo Tako who tried to protect her people.

See also
Somali Youth League

Notes

References

1948 deaths
20th-century Somalian people
Darod
Year of birth missing
Ethnic Somali people
Somalian politicians
Somalian women in politics
Somalian activists
Somalian women activists
People from Mogadishu
20th-century Somalian women